Johann Löser (23 March 1937 – 25 September 2020) was an Austrian footballer and manager. He played in one match for the Austria national football team in 1962.

References

External links
 

1937 births
2020 deaths
Austrian footballers
Austria international footballers
Place of birth missing
Association footballers not categorized by position
Austrian football managers
FK Austria Wien managers